Leslie Stuart Graham (born 9 January 1942) is a British former Grand Prix motorcycle road racer and Saloon car racing specialist.

He is the son of the 1949 500cc world champion, Leslie Graham.

Graham started racing in 1961 on a 125 cc Honda Benly Sports, followed by spells with Bill Webster and on Syd Lawton's Aermacchis. He also rode Bultacos, later selling his half-share in a garage to fund his full-time racing using a 350 cc AJS 7R and a 500 cc Matchless G50 for the 'classic' races.

His big break came when he was signed for the Honda factory team in July 1966, and later rode for Suzuki.

His best season was in 1967 when he won two Grand Prix races and finished the year in third place in both the 50cc and the 125cc world championships.

In the early 1970s he began car racing in Saloon classes, retiring in 1980 to concentrate on his business interests including a Honda dealership. Again reviving his racing in 1986, Graham has continued to appear in occasional historic car events.

Racing record

Complete British Saloon Car Championship results
(key) (Races in bold indicate pole position; races in italics indicate fastest lap.)

† Events with 2 races staged for the different classes.

References

 Stuart Graham career statistics at MotoGP.com

1942 births
English motorcycle racers
50cc World Championship riders
125cc World Championship riders
250cc World Championship riders
350cc World Championship riders
500cc World Championship riders
Isle of Man TT riders
Living people
British Touring Car Championship drivers
Place of birth missing (living people)